Sydney Ports Corporation may refer to:

 a predecessor agency to the Port Authority of New South Wales
 the former operator of Port Botany.